Wang Peng (Chinese:王鹏; born June 16, 1978 in Dalian) is a former Chinese international  footballer who played as a striker. In his playing career he represented Dalian Wanda where he won six Chinese league titles with them before having short spells with Sichuan First City and Shaanxi Baorong Chanba.

Club career

Dalian Shide
Wang Peng started his professional career with Dalian Wanda in the 1996 season making 3 appearances and scoring 1 goal. The following season was to prove extremely successful for Wang Peng as he won the league title with Dalian, playing a significant role by making 22 appearances and scoring 7 goals. During his time with Dalian he won several league titles and one Chinese FA Cup with them while also seeing the team change their name to Dalian Shide in 2000. By the 2004 season Wang Peng saw his playing time significantly reduced with the arrival of Ermin Šiljak and the return of Zoran Janković.

Loan moves and Shaanxi Baorong Chanba
Wang Peng moved to Sichuan First City for one season where he regained his form by scoring 8 goals in his 23 appearances, however Sichuan First City disbanded the following season and Wang Peng moved to Xi'an Chanba International on loan. After one season with Xi'an Chanba International, Wang Peng moved back to Dalian Shide for one more season before returning to Xi'an Chanba International, which had later changed its name to Shaanxi Baorong Chanba, on a permanent basis for 2 million yuan.

International career
Wang Peng would make his debut for the senior team on November 22, 1998 in a friendly against South Korea in a 0-0 draw. His performance was considered good enough for him to be included in 1998 Asian Games where Wang Peng would score his first goal against Lebanon and help China come third and in the tournament. He would unfortunately lose favour with new head coach Bora Milutinović and miss the 2002 FIFA World Cup, however while he would regain his position within the Chinese squad when Arie Haan became the next head coach Wang Peng could not take part in the 2004 AFC Asian Cup when he sustained an injury before the tournament. On his return to the national team he found it difficult to gain consistent playing time yet was still included in the 2007 AFC Asian Cup squad but did not play in any of their games in a disappointing tournament.

International goals

Honours
Dalian Wanda
Chinese Jia-A League/Chinese Super League: 1996, 1997, 1998, 2000, 2001, 2002
Chinese FA Cup: 2001

References

External links
Profile and news at sina.com

Player stats at sohu.com

1978 births
Living people
Association football forwards
Chinese footballers
Footballers from Dalian
China international footballers
2007 AFC Asian Cup players
Dalian Shide F.C. players
Sichuan Guancheng players
Beijing Renhe F.C. players
Chinese Super League players
Asian Games medalists in football
Footballers at the 1998 Asian Games
Asian Games bronze medalists for China
Medalists at the 1998 Asian Games